Mary Ashford may refer to

Mary Ann Ashford (1787–1870), cook and author of Life of a Licensed Victualler's Daughter
 Murder victim in the Ashford v Thornton case